Nana Afua Frema Busia was the Queen mother of Wenchi, and the First Lady of Ghana from 7 August 1970 to 31 August 1970. She was the sister of Kofi Abrefa Busia, formerly Prime Minister of Ghana.

References 

 

 

First ladies of Ghana